The A1307 is a secondary class A road in Cambridgeshire and Suffolk between the A1(M) near Alconbury and Haverhill, Suffolk. In 2020 the former A14 between North of Cambridge and Alconbury was reclassified as the A1307.

Route

A14 to Haverhill

The road starts at junction 31 on the A14 with access from only A14 traffic from the west and access to westbound A14 traffic towards Huntingdon. The road immediately continues into Cambridge (Girton) and heads into the centre as Huntingdon Road, passing Fitzwilliam College to a junction with the Cambridge inner ring road (the A1134) where the road terminates.
To rejoin the A1307 from here you may use the ring road (A1134/A603) around Cambridge to the junction at the Catholic Church, or routes through Cambridge city centre. Once on the A1307 again the road heads south east out of Cambridge as Hills Road, signposted to Haverhill. As the road continues out of Cambridge it passes Addenbrooke's Hospital. The road then passes Babraham Park and Ride. Green buses may be seen from here in Cambridge.
The road continues through the Gog Magog hills and past Wandlebury country park. The road then passes the Babraham business park and carries on to Fourwentways, an interchange with the A11 and services provided by Euro Garages and a hotel by Travelodge.
After passing Little Abington and Hildersham, the road passes Linton on the south side with the B1052 providing access to the village centre and goes southbound to Saffron Walden. The road then terminates at Haverhill in Suffolk.
Many fatal accidents have occurred along the route, particularly between Little Abington and Horseheath (close to the Cambridgeshire/Suffolk border), leading to frequent pressure from regular users to have safety improvements added. Mostly, council officials have been reluctant to spend resources on this, although the campaign has been gaining momentum in recent times.

Girton to Alconbury (formerly A14)

The removal of A14 Huntingdon railway viaduct, passing over Huntingdon railway station and Brampton Road, is reported to be completed in Spring 2022, allowing an alternative route for mainly local light vehicles via the A1307 from towns north of Cambridge to the A1(M).

On 9 December 2019 the former A14 between Swavesey and travelling north-west towards Huntingdon was reclassified as the A1307 following the opening of the Huntingdon Southern bypass, part of the A14 Cambridge to Huntingdon improvement scheme. 
 
From the Girton interchange (the old northern terminus of the A1307) to Bar Hill, the A1307 follows local access roads (opened in 2019) running parallel to the A14. From Bar Hill to the Swavesey interchange the former A14 Eastbound carriageway is utilised, including a new grade separated junction for Lolworth. 
From the Swavesey interchange to Huntingdon the A1307 also utilises the former A14 dual carriageway. En route are junctions for Fenstanton, St Ives, the Hemingfords and Godmanchester (former A14 Junctions 27–24). A junction for light vehicles to Huntingdon town centre and an access to Huntingdon Railway Station only were opened in 2021.

The A1307 Views Common link road from Hinchingbrook Park and east of Huntingdon railway station allows traffic from Brampton road to access the A141 for Wisbech and the A1(M) for Peterborough to the north, and the A1 via the A1307/A141 Spittals junction (updated Sept 2021).

This is part of the A14 trunk road (Cambridge to Huntingdon improvement scheme) which links the A1 with the M11 and routes to Felixstowe, together with remodelling near Huntingdon Railway station.

A1307 route map

References

Roads in England